No Spiritual Surrender is a 7-inch EP by American hardcore punk band Inside Out, released by Revelation Records in 1990. It was their only release before their breakup in 1991.
After the band broke up, it was released on CD with two additional tracks that were from the same recording session, but did not fit on the 7-inch.

The EP features Zack de la Rocha before he went on to form and front Rage Against the Machine. The album also features Vic DiCara, later of 108 playing the guitar, Mark Hayworth from Hardstance and Gorilla Biscuits playing the bass guitar and Chris Bratton from Chain of Strength playing the drums.

Track listing

Vinyl
 "Burning Fight"  – 3:26
 "Undertone"  – 1:41
 "By a Thread"  – 2:20
 "No Spiritual Surrender"  – 2:58

Cassette/CD
 "Burning Fight"  – 3:26
 "Undertone"  – 1:41
 "By a Thread"  – 2:20
 "No Spiritual Surrender"  – 2:58
 "Sacrifice"  – 2:30
 "Redemption"  – 2:09

Personnel 
 Zack de la Rocha - vocals
 Vic DiCara - guitar
 Mark Hayworth - bass
 Chris Bratton - drums

References

1990 debut EPs
Inside Out (band) albums